Helga Seibert (7 January 1939 – 12 April 1999) was a German judge. She was a judge in the Federal Constitutional Court of Germany. She was born in Witzenhausen, and died in Munich.

Shortly before her death she won the Fritz Bauer Prize from the Humanist Union. The explanatory memorandum stated; "The fact that a civil rights organization honors a supreme judge, may seem unusual, but it is for your work towards the specific benefits of dealing with fundamental rights."

External links

Page at the Federal Court

German women judges
Justices of the Federal Constitutional Court
1939 births
1999 deaths
People from Witzenhausen
Constitutional court women judges
People from Hesse-Nassau
German women lawyers
20th-century German lawyers
20th-century German judges
Grand Crosses with Star and Sash of the Order of Merit of the Federal Republic of Germany
20th-century women lawyers
20th-century women judges
20th-century German women